The Haihte Range is a small mountain range on central Vancouver Island, British Columbia, Canada. It has an area of 75 km2 and is a subrange of the Vancouver Island Ranges which in turn form part of the Insular Mountains.

The Haihte Range contains some of the largest remaining glaciers on Vancouver Island.

See also
List of mountain ranges

References

Vancouver Island Ranges